Pakistan competed at the 2020 Summer Olympics in Tokyo. Originally scheduled to take place from 24 July to 9 August 2020, the Games were postponed to 23 July to 8 August 2021, because of the COVID-19 pandemic. It was Pakistan's eighteenth appearance at the Summer Olympics.

This Olympics was Pakistan's best performance since 2000 with both Talha Talib & Arshad Nadeem reaching the finals of their respective events. Gulfam Joseph also barely missed out on reaching the final of his event.

Competitors

Athletics

Pakistani athletes further achieved the entry standards, either by qualifying time or by world ranking, in the following track and field events (up to a maximum of 3 athletes in each event):

Track & road events

Field events

Badminton

For the first time in history, Pakistan entered one badminton player into the Olympic tournament. Mahoor Shahzad accepted the invitation from the Tripartite Commission and the Badminton World Federation to compete in the women's singles.

Judo

Pakistan qualified one judoka for the men's half-heavyweight category (100 kg) at the Games. Rio 2016 Olympian Shah Hussain Shah accepted a continental berth from the Asian zone as the nation's top-ranked judoka outside of direct qualifying position in the IJF World Ranking List of June 28, 2021.

Shooting

Pakistani shooters achieved quota places for the following events by virtue of their best finishes at the 2018 ISSF World Championships, the 2019 ISSF World Cup series, and Asian Championships, as long as they obtained a minimum qualifying score (MQS) by May 31, 2020.

Swimming

Pakistan received a universality invitation from FINA to send two top-ranked swimmers (one per gender) in their respective individual events to the Olympics, based on the FINA Points System of June 28, 2021.

Weightlifting

Pakistan received an invitation from the Tripartite Commission and the IWF to send Talha Talib in the men's 67-kg category to the Olympics, marking the country's return to the sport for the first time since 1976.

Non-competing sports

Equestrian

For the first time in history, Pakistan qualified one eventing rider into the Olympic equestrian competition, by finishing in the top two, outside the group selection, of the individual FEI Olympic Rankings for Group F (Africa and Middle East). In September 2020, Azad Kashmir, who Usman Khan rode when he qualified, died after suffering a severe heart attack. Athletes and their horse qualify as a pair for the Olympics, leaving Khan's place at the Games in doubt.

In 2021, Khan attempted to qualify aboard a new horse Kasheer, but failed to obtain the minimum eligibility requirements at the Sydney International Three-Day Event in May. The following outcome implied that he would not be eligible to start at the Olympics. Attempting to obtain the minimum requirements on back-to-back weeks was against the regulations set by FEI, Khan competed the week after Sydney at an event in Naracoorte, where he suffered a rotational fall which resulted in the passing of Kasheer.

References

Nations at the 2020 Summer Olympics
2020
2020 in Pakistani sport
Pakistan at the Summer Olympics by year